George Smith (1902 – after 1926) was an English professional footballer of the 1920s.

Born in Liverpool, he joined Liverpool in 1922 from Runcorn, but never started a match for the "Reds" in The Football League. In 1923 he joined Gillingham of the Football League Third Division South, where he spent one season. He then moved to Tranmere Rovers, where he made 35 Football League appearances. After a short spell with Coventry City, he returned to first club Runcorn.

References

1902 births
Year of death missing
Footballers from Liverpool
English footballers
Runcorn F.C. Halton players
Liverpool F.C. players
Gillingham F.C. players
Tranmere Rovers F.C. players
Coventry City F.C. players
English Football League players
Association football midfielders